Vaxart COVID-19 vaccine is a COVID-19 vaccine candidate developed by Vaxart.

References 

Clinical trials
American COVID-19 vaccines
Viral vector vaccines